From Her to Eternity is a song by Nick Cave and the Bad Seeds appearing on their debut album From Her to Eternity. It was written by Barry Adamson, Blixa Bargeld, Nick Cave, Mick Harvey, Anita Lane and Hugo Race and was recorded in March 1984 at Trident Studios.

Mat Snow described the song as an "epic starring the most icy scalpel of a piano motif ever to cut to the heart of trauma. And backing it up is an arsenal of breakdown, electrocution and massacre that rises and rises again in the multiple orgasm of a man torturing himself to death."

Accolades

Personnel
Adapted from the From Her to Eternity liner notes.

Nick Cave and The Bad Seeds
Nick Cave – lead vocals, Hammond organ
Blixa Bargeld – electric guitar
Hugo Race – electric guitar
Barry Adamson – bass guitar
Mick Harvey – drums, piano, vibraphone

Production and additional personnel
 Flood – production, engineering
 Tim Young – mastering

See also
Nick Cave and The Bad Seeds discography

References 

1984 songs
Nick Cave songs
Songs written by Barry Adamson
Songs written by Blixa Bargeld
Songs written by Nick Cave
Songs written by Mick Harvey
Songs written by Anita Lane
Songs written by Hugo Race
Song recordings produced by Flood (producer)